Tyee is an unincorporated community located in Douglas County, Oregon.

References

Unincorporated communities in Douglas County, Oregon
Unincorporated communities in Oregon